Attundaland (or the land of the eight hundreds) was the name given to the southeastern part of the present day province of Uppland, north of Stockholm. Its name refers to its role of providing 800 men and 32 ships for the leidang of the Swedish kings at Uppsala.

Snorri Sturluson relates that Tiundaland was the richest and most fertile region of Sweden. It was the seat of the Swedish kings at Uppsala and later the Swedish Archbishopric.  All the Swedish lawspeakers were subordinate to the lawspeaker of Tiundaland.

The name of Attunda was revived as Attunda district court (Attunda tingsrätt) in April 2007, through the fusion of Sollentuna and Södra Roslags district courts. The seat of Attunda district court is situated in Sollentuna Municipality.

See also

Fjärdhundraland
Roslagen
Stones of Mora
Suiones
Uppsala öd

Uppland
Geography of Stockholm County